Lie, Cheat & Steal (2003) is a double album by drum and bass artist Klute. The second disc is titled You Should Be Ashamed and contains non-drum and bass tracks.

The U.S. version of the album was released via Breakbeat Science Recordings.

Critical reception
CMJ New Music Report wrote that the album keeps Klute's place "amongst the drum 'n' bass elite secure."

Track listing

Disc one
"Now Always Forever"  – 6:09
"Ambient Hell"  – 6:06
"Song Seller"  – 4:52
"Traffico"  – 6:00
"Problem Reaction"  – 6:07
"Tacky"  – 6:36
"Kickin Tha Habit"  – 6:41
"Candy Ass"  – 6:18
"Part of Me"  – 5:46
"Ether"  – 5:57
"Oshima"  – 5:22
"Evo Sniffer"  – 7:57

Disc two
"Machines Do The Work"  – 5:45
"Tubby"  – 6:11
"Ultra Lo"  – 5:31
"Music for Doubles"  – 6:29
"Black Flag"  – 5:57
"2 Lives"  – 6:11
"Crucial"  – 4:10
"Overchoice"  – 7:07
"Artificial Sense"  – 5:27
"Wishing 4 Better"  – 6:41

References

2003 albums
Klute (musician) albums